The Shenzhen Concert Hall is a concert hall in Futian District, Shenzhen, Guangdong, China.

History background 
The city government of Shenzhen funded it. Almost 160,000 people attended performances there in 2017.

Arata Isozaki and Associated built it in 2008.

References

External links
 Shenzhen Concert Hall
 

Futian District
Concert halls in China
Buildings and structures in Shenzhen